

States General of the Netherlands (2002)
An opinion poll conducted by the States General of the Netherlands in 2002 had the following results for the best and the worst prime minister of the twentieth century.
Of the 225 MPs, 200 responded. Of them, 110 (49 per cent of MPs) handed in a list, the others did not participate for various reasons. The participation by political parties is as follows: Labour Party 57%,  People's Party for Freedom and Democracy 44%, Christian Democratic Appeal 43%, Democrats 66 39%, GroenLinks 58%, Socialist Party 43%, Reformed Political Party 20%, Christian Union 44% and the Independent Senate Group 100%.

VPRO (2006)
In 2006 Dutch public broadcaster VPRO conducted an opinion poll for the best prime minister after World War II.

NRC Handelsblad (2013)
In 2013 newspaper NRC Handelsblad conducted two opinion polls, one with fifty experts and one with their readers. The polls asked respondents to give their opinion on who was the best prime minister since 1900.

Maurice de Hond (2013)
An opinion poll conducted by Maurice de Hond from the polling site peil.nl had the following results.

I&O Research (2020)
An opinion panel conducted by I&O Research with fifty experts had the following results when asked on who was the best prime minister since 1945.

See also
Historical rankings of prime ministers of Australia
Historical rankings of prime ministers of Canada
Historical rankings of chancellors of Germany
Historical rankings of prime ministers of the United Kingdom
Historical rankings of presidents of the United States
 Prime Minister of the Netherlands
 List of prime ministers of the Netherlands
 List of prime ministers of the Netherlands by education
 Religious affiliations of prime ministers of the Netherlands

References

Netherlands